= WotWentWrong =

Defunct dating website

WotWentWrong was a website and free online application that allowed users to request feedback from dates and partners who did not want to pursue a relationship further but did not explain why. It was created in January 2012 by Audrey Melnik, an Australian IT consultant and businesswoman. Melnik calls the application "a breakup app for couples who never really broke up." The website earned revenue from contextual advertisements that appear at the bottom of dating and feedback reports. Two weeks after its launch, the site had received 28,000 unique visitors.

== The application ==
WotWentWrong's registered users could send customizable e-mails to request feedback from a specific person. The person asking for these reasons could also rate the other person on a variety of factors. The individual receiving the feedback request would only be able to see these ratings once they formally responded. Feedback could be given through predefined reasons or individualized explanations. When the user viewed the feedback report, WotWentWrong supplied customized advice and product recommendations oriented towards the chosen or indicated reasons and explanations. Melnik called the application a "socially-acceptable" way to get feedback on dates.

== Dating statistics ==
In May 2012, WotWentWrong released a compilation of statistics explaining the top reasons that people had given, to those users who asked for dating feedback. The most-significant data was placed in an infographic, The top three reasons that men dumped women were: "not ready for a commitment", "low sex drive", and "bad hygiene". The top three reasons given by women were: "there’s someone else", "our dietary habits differ too much", and "too high maintenance".
